Hemmatabad-e Vahab (also Romanized as Hemmatābād-e Vāhab) is a village in Gonbaki Rural District, Gonbaki District, Rigan County, Kerman Province, Iran. At the 2006 census, its population was 32, in 9 families.

References 

Populated places in Rigan County